All Videos Ever Made & More - The Complete Collection 1987-2001 is the third music video compilation by Swedish pop music duo Roxette, released on 19 November 2001 on DVD by Roxette Recordings and EMI. The video is over 4 hours in length, and features every music video the duo created between 1987 and 2001, as well as numerous rare and unreleased performance videos and two feature-length documentaries created by Sveriges Television: the 1990 documentary "The Making of Joyride", and the 1996 road movie documenting the band on their "Crash! Boom! Bang! Tour".

Track listing
All songs written by Per Gessle, except "Listen to Your Heart", "Spending My Time", "(Do You Get) Excited?", "Queen of Rain" and "She Doesn't Live Here Anymore" by Gessle and Mats Persson; "You Don't Understand Me" by Gessle and Desmond Child; "Un Día Sin Ti" by Gessle, Persson and Luis Gómez Escolar. All songs produced by Clarence Öfwerman, except "She Doesn't Live Here Anymore" by Gessle and Michael Ilbert; "Wish I Could Fly", "Anyone", "Stars", "Salvation" and "The Centre of the Heart" by Marie Fredriksson, Gessle, Ilbert and Öfwerman; "Real Sugar" and "Milk and Toast and Honey" by Fredriksson, Gessle and Öfwerman.

Charts

References

Roxette video albums
2001 video albums
Music video compilation albums
2001 compilation albums